This article lists events from the year 2017 in the Ivory Coast.

Incumbents

 President: Alassane Ouattara
 Vice President: Daniel Kablan Duncan (from January 16) (Note: Vice President position was established January 16)
 Prime Minister: Daniel Kablan Duncan (until January 10); Amadou Gon Coulibaly (from January 10)

Events

January
6-8 January - A major mutiny broke out among the army of Ivory Coast.
10 January - Amadou Gon Coulibaly took over as the new prime minister.
16 January - Daniel Kablan Duncan becomes the first Vice President of the Ivory Coast per result of the referendum in where voters approved the  2016 Constitution of the Ivory Coast

May
12 May - Soldiers mutiny against the government again over a pay dispute by blocking access to Ivory Coast's second largest city, Bouaké.

Sport
Football season: The 2016–17 Ligue 1 comprises 14 teams

Deaths

5 June – Cheick Tioté, footballer (b. 1986)

References

Links

 
Years of the 21st century in Ivory Coast
Ivory Coast
Ivory Coast
2010s in Ivory Coast